Derek William Sankey (born December 17, 1948) is a former member of the Canadian national men's basketball team.  He was a member of the Canadian team which finished fourth at the 1976 Summer Olympics.

A native of Vancouver, British Columbia, Sankey played high school basketball at Lord Byng High School and college basketball at the University of British Columbia.  He was a member of two Thunderbirds teams that won the CIAU national championship, one in 1967 and the other in 1970.  He was named a CIAU First Team All-Canadian in 1970.

Sankey played for Canada at the 1970 FIBA World Championship, the 1970 World Student Games, the qualifying tournament for the 1972 Summer Olympics, the 1975 Pan Am Games, and the 1976 Summer Olympics.

Sankey was inducted into the Naismith Museum and Hall of Fame in 1994 and the Basketball BC Hall of Fame in 2007.

References
Basketball BC Hall of Fame inductee page
Sports-Reference

1948 births
Living people
Basketball people from British Columbia
Basketball players at the 1976 Summer Olympics
Basketball players at the 1975 Pan American Games
Canadian men's basketball players
Olympic basketball players of Canada
Pan American Games competitors for Canada
Basketball players from Vancouver
UBC Thunderbirds basketball players
1970 FIBA World Championship players